William Cashin is a former Irish Labour Party politician. He was an unsuccessful candidate for the Cork North-West constituency at the 1992 and 1997 general elections. He served as a member of Seanad Éireann for four years, to which he was nominated by the Taoiseach Albert Reynolds in 1993.

References

Year of birth missing (living people)
Living people
Labour Party (Ireland) senators
Members of the 20th Seanad
Politicians from County Cork
Nominated members of Seanad Éireann